Tulcus paganus is a species of beetle in the family Cerambycidae. It was described by Francis Polkinghorne Pascoe in 1859. It is known from Bolivia, Brazil, Colombia and Peru.

References

paganus
Beetles described in 1859